Glukhari is a rural locality (a selo) and the administrative center of Kurgansky Selsoviet of Svobodnensky District, Amur Oblast, Russia. The population was 161 as of 2018. There are 9 streets.

Geography 
Glukhari is located on the right bank of the Bolshaya Pera River, 48 km north of Svobodny (the district's administrative centre) by road. Tsiolkovsky is the nearest rural locality.

References 

Rural localities in Svobodnensky District